Giorgi Balashvili (born 7 August 1973) is a former Georgian professional football player.

See also
Football in Georgia
List of football clubs in Georgia

References

External links
 

1973 births
Living people
Footballers from Georgia (country)
Association football defenders
Expatriate footballers from Georgia (country)
Expatriate footballers in Russia
Georgia (country) international footballers
FC Angusht Nazran players
FC Dila Gori players
FC Lokomotivi Tbilisi players